Andrés Antonio "Tony" González (born August 28, 1936) is a Cuban former professional baseball outfielder, who played in Major League Baseball (MLB) for the Cincinnati Reds, Philadelphia Phillies (–), San Diego Padres, Atlanta Braves (–), and California Angels (–).

Career 
A fine center fielder, González spent his best years with the Phillies. He had an average, though accurate, arm with excellent range. As a hitter, González batted for average with occasional power, drew a significant number of walks, was a good bunter, and had enough power to collect an above-average number of doubles and triples. In , his career-high .339 batting average was second only to Roberto Clemente’s .357 for the NL batting crown, which also ranked second in the major leagues.

In his twelve-season MLB career, González hit .286 (1,485-for-5,195), with 103 home runs, 615 runs batted in (RBI), 690 runs, 238 doubles, 57 triples, and 79 stolen bases, in 1,559 games. Defensively, he recorded a .987 fielding percentage, while playing at all three outfield positions.

In the 1969 National League Championship Series against the New York Mets, González hit .357, with two RBI, one double, four runs, and one homer (off Tom Seaver). Following his big league career, González played part of the   season for the Hiroshima Toyo Carp of Nippon Professional Baseball (NPB).

In total, González made about 5,800 trips to the plate over his major league career (about 4,600 — or 80% — of them against right-handed pitchers and the other 1,200 — or 20% — against left-handers); so, González averaged about 400 plate appearances per year against righties and 100 plate appearances against lefties. In total, he hit .286, with a .350 on-base percentage, and a .413 slugging percentage. But what is striking about González is that he exhibited a rather pronounced platoon-split during his career — that is, being a left-handed batter, he hit right-handed pitchers much better than he hit southpaws. For his career, Gonzalez hit .303 against righties, with a .366 on-base percentage, and a .442 slugging percentage; against lefties, these numbers were only .219/.288/.299. Given that the 1960s were a time of reduced offensive output — due in part to a larger strike zone and 4-man (rather than 5-man) rotations — his performance against righties was exceptional, and if he would have had a right-handed hitting platoon-mate — that could have covered his 100 or so plate appearances against southpaws each year — González might merit consideration as one of the best hitters of the decade.

During the  season, González was the first MLB player to wear a batting helmet with a pre-molded ear-flap. He was in the NL top-ten in being hit by pitches, and the special helmet was constructed specifically for his use.

References

External links

Tony González at SABR (Baseball BioProject)

1936 births
Living people
Atlanta Braves players
California Angels players
Cincinnati Reds players
Philadelphia Phillies players
San Diego Padres players
Major League Baseball outfielders
Major League Baseball players from Cuba
Cuban expatriate baseball players in the United States
Hiroshima Toyo Carp players
Cuban expatriate baseball players in Japan
People from Ciego de Ávila Province